Virna Lindt is a Swedish singer and record producer. Her debut single "Attention Stockholm" became an indie-chart hit in 1982. She released two studio albums, Shiver in 1983 and Play/Record in 1985, both on the Compact Organization label. Both collaborations with writer/producer/arranger Tot Taylor. Combining pop, soundtrack and experimental influences, they have since been reissued on CD by LTM. Her style has been described as "John Barry-meets-new wave" and, in another review, a diseuse.

After a long hiatus, Lindt returned to music in 2019 with the release "Avant-garde Pts 1 & 2," and in 2021 with the single "Once."

Discography
 Shiver (1983)
 Play/Record (1985)
 Avant-garde Pts 1 & 2 (2019)
 Once (2021)

References

External links
Virna Lindt biography at LTM
Virna Lindt discography at Discogs

Place of birth missing (living people)
Year of birth missing (living people)
Living people
Swedish women singers